Hip hop music in Washington, D.C. has been an important part of the culture of the area. 

In the early 1980s, DC's DJ100 was the first station to play Hip-Hop, including the likes of Whistle 2, Run-DMC, Kool Moe Dee, and The Beastie Boys. DJ100, 100.3fm aired from 1984 to 1990, before turning into a jazz station, then eventually an oldies station.

Other prominent D.C. stations include WPGC 95.5 and WKYS 93.9 which are both currently still on the air. The city's traditional style has been described as not quite the same as New York City hip hop nor Southern hip hop. Rather, it has been influenced by both regions to form its own unique style of music. The population of D.C. is not large enough to support as many distinct subgenres of rap as other metropolitan areas, and as a result, the sound and style of D.C. hip hop is very mixed.

Scene
Prominent D.C.-based hip hop artists include producers Oddisee, Kev Brown, Damu the Fudgemunk, BlakeNine. MC's Wale, XO, yU, Fat Trel, Shy Glizzy, Head Roc, Watusi, Lightshow, Ant Glizzy, Ron Stackz, Pharaoh Jonez and Santino Ranks of YNWV. Nationally recognized newcomers include GoldLink, Chaz French, and IDK. Groups like Team Demolition, the Beat Konductaz and Panacea have also made great strides for Washington, D.C. hip hop. Local radio stations 93.9 WKYS and 95.5 WPGC sometimes feature up and comers from the area.

20bello, a rapper, director, and promoter, was the original founder of the DMV (D for the District of Columbia, M for Maryland, and V for Northern Virginia, which together create the DC Metro area) music movement. He remains influential in the scene.

Hip hop has been greatly overshadowed by go-go music, a post-funk type of music that is only relevant in the District of Columbia. Go-go music was created in the D.C. area and remains a very significant aspect of the culture of the city and surrounding areas. It emphasizes large percussion sections, and incorporates call and response and shout-outs into its songs. This results in a crowd that is very active and involved with the music, responding by dancing and echoing the words. Chuck Brown is known as the "godfather of go-go", but the genre is still alive today, with groups such as The Backyard Band, TCB, and UCB enjoying great local success.

Notable people

Chuck Brown 

Chuck Brown achieved significant fame in and around Washington, D.C. for being the most popular artist in go-go's earlier days. He influenced a generation of new bands and was the driving force behind popularizing go-go. To many in the area, Brown and his music represented a culture and attitude that was representative of life in Washington, D.C. He died in May 2012. Shortly after his death, nearly every radio station in D.C. played his music. There were many tributes in the following days that came in the form of funerals, concerts, and vigils.

Rico Nasty

Wale 

Born in Washington, D.C. to Nigerian parents, Wale is notable both for being the first major hip hop label signing from Washington, D.C. and for the way he has fused go-go music with rap music. Having grown up in and around D.C., he has tried to include elements of go-go in his music. This comes in the form of the type of percussion beats, shout outs, and subject matter of his songs. Wale's song "Pretty Girls" most notably contains a sample and hook from the song of the same name by The Backyard Band. In 2009, Wale and go-go band UCB performed together at the MTV Video Music Awards show.

Oddisee 

Oddisee is the a member of both the Low Budget Crew and the Diamond District Group, both groups of rappers from Washington, D.C. Oddisee's music is very percussion-based with lyrics about life in D.C. and Prince George's County, a suburb located in Maryland.

Panacea 

Panacea is a hip-hop duo from Washington, D.C., starting in 2003. The duo consists of MC Raw Poetic (Jason Moore) and producer K-Murdock (Kyle Murdock). They have produced several albums and EPs over the years.

Logic

Logic released six studio albums and received two Grammy Award nominations.

Logic began his music career in 2010, releasing the mixtape Young, Broke & Infamous; he gained popularity with his Young Sinatra mixtape series, with the response to its third iteration, Young Sinatra: Welcome to Forever (2013), helping Logic secure a recording contract with Def Jam Recordings. Logic's first two studio albums — Under Pressure (2014) and The Incredible True Story (2015) — both peaked within the top five on the U.S. Billboard 200, while the former was ultimately certified platinum.

Logic achieved mainstream popularity in 2017 with Everybody; the album charted at number one in the United States and was certified platinum, while its lead single, "1-800-273-8255", reached number three on the U.S. Billboard Hot 100, and was a top-ten hit internationally. He also released the commercial mixtape series Bobby Tarantino. His fourth and fifth albums, YSIV (2018) and Confessions of a Dangerous Mind (2019), achieved similar commercial success, with the latter containing the single "Homicide", which peaked at number five on the Hot 100. Logic began a streaming career after releasing his final album, No Pressure, in 2020, before returning to music in 2021 with Bobby Tarantino III (2021).

Cordae

Cordae Amari Dunston, known mononymously as Cordae, is an American rapper, singer, and songwriter. Cordae gained popularity by releasing remixes of popular songs, such as "My Name Is" by Eminem, and "Old Niggas" which was a response to the song "1985" by J. Cole. Videos to both remixes were uploaded to the WorldStarHipHop's YouTube channel, which led to an immense and immediate positive response from both mainstream media and the online rap community. His debut studio album, The Lost Boy, was released on July 26, 2019 to widespread acclaim and received two nominations for Best Rap Album and Best Rap Song for the single "Bad Idea" at the 62nd Grammy Awards. Cordae was a member of the YBN collective from 2018 until he left the group in 2020.

Xanman

Haile Salaam, known professionally as Xanman, is a rapper from DC suburb Landover, MD. Known for his off beat flow, singing comparable to Rod Wave, and "out of pocket" lyrics, Xanman has had lots of success with songs like "Gucci Down", "Foulin' the Plug", and "I'm Tryna Yeah." He has collaborated with artists such as his cousin YungManny, SosMula of City Morgue, and NoCap.

References

Music of Washington, D.C.
American hip hop scenes